The 2011 Northern Ireland Milk Cup is the twenty-ninth edition of the international football tournament which takes place annually in the north coast of Northern Ireland, and attracts competitors from across the globe. There are three sections to the tournament, the Elite Section (U19), the Premier Section (U17) and the Junior Section (U15). The defending champions are the USA, Etoile Lusitana and Chelsea respectively.

The Elite section has six teams in 2011, with each team playing two group matches on the Monday and Wednesday. The top two teams in the table after the group stage compete in the final on Friday evening, with the remaining teams playing off for final standings earlier that day.

The Junior and Premier sections are to be contested by 24 and 20 teams respectively this year. Each team plays once on Monday, Tuesday and Wednesday as part of a single league, from which the top 4 teams qualify for the Milk Cup semi-finals. The remainder of the teams qualify for lower-level cups (namely the Milk Globe, Vase, Bowl and Plate) that run alongside the Milk Cup based on their final league position, with semi-finals on Thursday, and the finals and play-off matches on Friday. In 2011 for the second time the finals night will be held at the Ballymena Showgrounds, rather than the traditional venue of the Coleraine Showgrounds.

Elite – Under 19s – national sides
Premier – Under 17s – club sides and national sides
Junior – Under 15s – club sides and national sides

Clubs and national teams from anywhere in the world may compete on invitation, and five continents will be represented - Europe, North America, South America, Africa and Asia. The tournament is also continuing its tradition of allowing the host nation's youth to play against top opposition through six select teams from each county of Northern Ireland

Venues

Elite Section

Group stage

5th Place Playoff

3rd Place Playoff

Final

Premier Section

Teams ranked 1–4 qualify for Milk Cup Semi-FinalsTeams ranked 5–8 qualify for NIMC Globe Semi-FinalsTeams ranked 9–12 qualify for NIMC Vase Semi-FinalsTeams ranked 13–16 qualify for NIMC Bowl Semi-FinalsTeams ranked 17–20 qualify for NIMC Plate Semi-Finals

Group stage

Monday 25 July

Tuesday 26 July

Wednesday 27 July

Thursday 28 July 

2011 Milk Cup
SuperCupNI
Milk